Andrew MacKinnon was a Scotland international rugby union player. He played as a Forward.

Rugby Union career

Amateur career

He played for London Scottish.

Provincial career

Fasson played for the Anglo-Scots in 1898.

International career

He was capped 6 times for Scotland from 1898 to 1900.

References

1873 births
1952 deaths
Scottish rugby union players
Scotland international rugby union players
Rugby union players from Glasgow
Scottish Exiles (rugby union) players
London Scottish F.C. players
Rugby union forwards